LokNews.online is a California-based English language weekly newspaper and an online news portal focusing on South Asians (Indian, Pakistani, Bangladeshi, Fijian, Sri Lankan, amongst others) throughout the world. The newspaper was launched in 2008 as a weekly tabloid print newspaper. Both the online and print edition are available free of cost. It claims to be a good source for modern South Asians to stay connected with others. Most of the readers for it are NRIs & PIOs (Non-resident Indian and Person of Indian Origin) based in the US.

It was launched August 19, 2008 and is published by Lok Media Corp, which also publishes another South Asian newspaper, Quami Ekta

References

External links 
 Official Lok News website
 Lok Media Corp website (Publisher of Lok News)

Asian-American culture in California
Asian-American press
Bangladeshi-American culture
Fijian diaspora
Indian-American culture in California
Mass media of Indian diaspora
Weekly newspapers published in California
Pakistani-American culture in California
Sri Lankan-American culture